Cauquira Airport  is an airstrip serving Cauquira, a village in Gracias a Dios Department, Honduras. The airstrip and village are on a wooded barrier spit protecting the Cauquira and Caratasca Lagoons.

See also

 Transport in Honduras
 List of airports in Honduras

References

External links
 FalllingRain - Cauquira Airport
 HERE Maps - Cauquira
 OpenStreetMap - Cauquira
 OurAirports - Cauquira Airport
 

Airports in Honduras